The Stade 15 Octobre is a multi-use stadium in Bizerte, Tunisia ( north-west of Tunis). It has a capacity of 20,000 seats of which 4,000 are covered. The stadium hosted matches of the 2004 African Cup of Nations, which has also been won by the Tunisian team, but it is usually used by CA Bizertin.

The stadium is named encrypted the date corresponding to the evacuation of the last foreign soldier of independent Tunisia, on 15 October 1963 after Bizerte crisis. The space devoted to various media features 170 workstations.

References

Bizerte
Club Athlétique Bizertin
Bizerte
1990 establishments in Tunisia
Sports venues completed in 1990